The 2000 Illinois State Redbirds football team represented Illinois State University as a member of the Gateway Football Conference during the 2000 NCAA Division I-AA football season. Led by first-year head coach Denver Johnson, the Redbirds compiled an overall record of 7–4 with a mark of 4–2 in conference play, tying for second place in the Gateway. Illinois State was ranked No. 24 in The Sports Network's postseason ranking of NCAA Division I-AA teams. The team played home games at Hancock Stadium in Normal, Illinois.

In their opening game against  an NCAA Division II team, the Redbirds scored 75 points, the most the team had scored in a game since 1937.

Schedule

References

Illinois State
Illinois State Redbirds football seasons
Illinois State Redbirds football